Pietraszki  is a village in the administrative district of Gmina Gołdap within Gołdap County Warmian-Masurian Voivodeship, in northern Poland.

References

Pietraszki